A noha (translit. nūḥa/nawḥa), when interpreted in light of Shia views, is an elegy about the tragedy of Husayn ibn Ali in the Battle of Karbala.

Marsiya and Noha have the historical and social milieu of pre-Islamic Arabic and Persian culture. The sub-parts of Marsiya are called Noha and Soaz which means lamentation. It is usually a poem of mourning. Lamentation has a central part in the literature of the followers and devotees of the Shia sect and its offshoots.  The tradition of elegizing Hussain and the Karbala tragedy is not limited to Arabic speaking poets. Poets from different languages have also contributed significant poetic literature in their language.  In Urdu language, a number of poets like, Mir Anis and Mirza Dabeer have contributed a treasure in Marsiya and its sub-branch Noha.  In like manner, English-speaking poets, whether Muslim, Christian, have also made significant contributions to produce elegies for Imam Hussain and the Karbala tragic incidents.

See also
Mourning of Muharram
Juloos 
Rawda Khwani
Marsiyah
Majalis

Notes and references

Arabic poetry
Shia literature
Cultural depictions of Husayn ibn Ali
Persian poetry